Gisilia meyi is a moth in the family Cosmopterigidae. It was described by Sinev in 2007.Type locality: Namibia, Brandberg, Mason Shelter, 1740 m. It is found in Namibia.

References

Natural History Museum Lepidoptera generic names catalog

Endemic fauna of Namibia
Moths described in 2007
Chrysopeleiinae
Moths of Africa